The 2015–16 UNC Wilmington Seahawks men's basketball team represented the University of North Carolina Wilmington during the 2015–16 NCAA Division I men's basketball season. The Seahawks were led by second-year head coach Kevin Keatts and played their home games at the Trask Coliseum. They were members of the Colonial Athletic Association. They finished the season 25–8, 14–4 in CAA play to finish in a tie for the CAA championship with Hofstra. They were champions of the CAA tournament to earn an automatic bid to the NCAA tournament where they lost in the first round to Duke.

Previous season
The Seahawks finished the season 18–14, 12–6 in CAA play to finish in a four way tie for the CAA regular season championship. They advanced to the semifinals of the CAA tournament where they lost to Northeastern. They were invited to the CollegeInsider.com Tournament where they lost in the first round to Sam Houston State.

Departures

Recruiting class of 2015

Incoming transfers

Roster

Schedule

|-
!colspan=9 style="background:#006666; color:#FFFF66;"| Exhibition

|-
!colspan=9 style="background:#006666; color:#FFFF66;"| Non-conference regular season

|-
!colspan=9 style="background:#006666; color:#FFFF66;"| CAA regular season

|-
!colspan=9 style="background:#006666; color:#FFFF66;"| CAA tournament

|-
!colspan=9 style="background:#006666; color:#FFFF66;"|NCAA tournament

See also
2015–16 UNC Wilmington Seahawks women's basketball team

References

UNC Wilmington Seahawks men's basketball seasons
Unc Wilmington
Unc Wilmington